Enyo Krastovchev (born 7 February 1984) is a retired Bulgarian footballer who played as a striker.

Career

Marek Dupnitsa
Krastovchev was raised in Marek Dupnitsa's youth teams. He made his official debut in A PFG at the age of 18 in 2002. In July 2006 Krastovchev was training with Litex Lovech, but then he decided to return to Dupnitsa. Between 2002 and 2008, he played 90 matches and scored 19 goals for Marek. He returned to his hometown club in 2013, but left in July 2018.

Levski Sofia
On 19 February 2008, Krastovchev joined Levski Sofia on trial. The next day, he played one half-time for Levski in a friendly match against Vidima-Rakovski Sevlievo. On 26 February 2008, he signed a contract with the team.

He made his official debut for Levski on 2 March 2008 in a match against Vihren Sandanski, in which he also scored his first goal for the team.

On 9 April 2007, Krastovchev scored all four goals for Levski in a 4–0 win against his former team Marek Dupnitsa.

In the 2009–10 season, Krastovchev scored his first goal of the season on 8 August 2009 against Botev Plovdiv in a 5–0 home win. Due to Georgi Hristov's bad patch of form over a number of games, Krastovchev gradually managed to establish himself as the first choice forward for Levski, scoring a number of important goals, including a goal in the 3–2 away win against Sportist Svoge.

Club career statistics
This statistic includes domestic league, domestic cup and European tournaments.

Awards
 Champion of Bulgaria 2009

References

External links
 
 Profile at LevskiSofia.info

1984 births
Living people
People from Dupnitsa
Sportspeople from Kyustendil Province
Bulgarian footballers
First Professional Football League (Bulgaria) players
Second Professional Football League (Bulgaria) players
Azerbaijan Premier League players
PFC Marek Dupnitsa players
PFC Levski Sofia players
AZAL PFK players
Shamakhi FK players
PFC Spartak Varna players
Kalamata F.C. players
Bulgarian expatriate footballers
Bulgarian expatriate sportspeople in Azerbaijan
Bulgarian expatriate sportspeople in Greece
Expatriate footballers in Azerbaijan
Expatriate footballers in Greece
Association football forwards